Jeremy Roy David Thomson  (born 24 June 1967) is a South African former rugby union player.

Playing career
Thomson represented  at the Craven Week tournament for schoolboys and was selected for the South African Schools team in 1986. He returned to Natal and continued to play 152 matches for the union.

At the end of the 1996 season, he toured with the Springboks to Argentina and Europe. Thomson did not play in any test matches but played in four tour matches, scoring one try for the Springboks.

See also
List of South Africa national rugby union players – Springbok no. 648
List of South Africa national under-18 rugby union team players

References

1967 births
Living people
Golden Lions players
Rugby union players from Pietermaritzburg
Saracens F.C. players
Sharks (Currie Cup) players
Sharks (rugby union) players
South Africa international rugby union players
South African rugby union players
Rugby union centres